was a stable of sumo wrestlers, one of the Nishonoseki group of stables. It was founded in 1993 by former komusubi Futagodake of the Futagoyama stable. It was one of the smallest of all the sumo stables, with just three sumo wrestlers. The stable was dissolved after the September 2008 tournament, as Futagodake was due to reach the mandatory retirement age of 65. Two of the stable's wrestlers retired following the announcement, with the one remaining active wrestler, Mongolian Arawashi, moving to Hanakago stable. Futagodake worked at Matsugane stable until his retirement in November 2008. 

Arawashi continued wrestling until January 2020, the last surviving member of the stable to retire.

Owner
1993-2008: 12th Araiso (former komusubi Futagodake)

See also 
List of sumo stables

External links 
Araiso stable page at Japan Sumo Association (English) (Japanese)

Defunct sumo stables